The Lafarge Rocks are one large and several smaller rocks lying  northwest of Casy Island and  west of Prime Head, the northern tip of the Antarctic Peninsula. They were discovered by a French expedition, 1837–1840, under Captain Jules Dumont d'Urville, and named by him for Ensign  Antoine Pavin de la Farge of the expedition ship Zélée. They were recharted by the Falkland Islands Dependencies Survey in 1946.

References

Rock formations of the Trinity Peninsula